For details of school uniforms in the United Kingdom see:

 School uniforms in England
 School uniforms in Northern Ireland
 School uniforms in Scotland
 School uniforms in Wales

Education in the United Kingdom
British uniforms